Mareyada Deepavali is a 1972 Kannada-language romantic drama film directed by R. Sampath and produced by M. Jagannath Rao. The film starred Rajesh, Kalpana and R. N. Sudarshan in lead roles.

The film's soundtrack and score by Vijaya Bhaskar was widely acclaimed.

Cast 

 Rajesh 
 Kalpana 
 R. N. Sudarshan
 Sampath
 K. S. Ashwath
 Srilalitha
 Baby Rani
 Ramachandra Shastry

Soundtrack 
The music was composed by Vijaya Bhaskar with lyrics by R. N. Jayagopal.

References

External links 
 

1972 films
1970s Kannada-language films
Indian romantic drama films
Indian black-and-white films
Films scored by Vijaya Bhaskar
1972 romantic drama films